Sanggye Pal (1267 - 1314) was a Tibetan Imperial Preceptor (Dishi) at the court of the Mongol-led Yuan dynasty of China. He hailed from Sakya which was the foremost monastic regime in Tibet in this period. He held the dignity from 1305 to his death in 1314.

Sanggye Pal belonged to the Khangsarpa family, being the son of Sumpa Drakpa Gyaltsen. He was the younger brother of Drakpa Odzer who previously held the Dishi title. According to the Yuan shi (History of the Yuan Dynasty), the old Dishi Jamyang Rinchen Gyaltsen (d. 1305) was followed first by a Duoerjibale (Dorje Pal) in 1305–13, and then Sangjiayizhashi (Sanggye Tashi) in 1313–14. However, a document sent to the Tibetan myriarchy Zhalu in 1307 is issued by Sanggye Pal. It is therefore probable that Sanggye Pal took over the Dishi dignity in 1305 and kept it until 1314, and that he was also known as Dorje Pal. For the rest, not much is known of his activities. Tibet in this period was relatively stable under the administration of the Yuan dynasty. The Sakya see was ruled in this period by Zangpo Pal (1306-1323); one of his many sons, Kunga Lotro Gyaltsen, succeeded Sanggye Pal at his demise in 1314.

See also
 Tibet under Yuan rule
 History of Tibet
 Mongol Empire
 Sakya Trizin

References

Imperial Preceptors
1267 births
1314 deaths
14th-century Tibetan people